The 1993 Sacramento Gold Miners finished in 5th place in the West Division with a 6–12 record and missed the playoffs. In 1993, the Canadian Football League admitted its first U.S. franchise, the Sacramento Gold Miners (formerly the Sacramento Surge of the WLAF), in an attempt to broaden Canadian football's popular appeal and boost league revenues.

Preseason

Schedule

Regular season

Season standings

Schedule

Awards and honors

References

External links
 Sacramento Gold Miners team profile

Ham
Sacramento Gold Miners
1993 in sports in California